The Foundation of San Diego de Alcalá-Fundación de la Vega del Pozo (Spanish: Fundación de San Diego de Alcalá-Fundación de la Vega del Pozo) is a foundation located in Guadalajara, Spain. It was declared Bien de Interés Cultural in 1993.

References 

Bien de Interés Cultural landmarks in the Province of Guadalajara